Iglesia de la Virgen de la Guía (Llanes) is a church in Llanes, Asturias, Spain.

See also
Asturian art
Catholic Church in Spain
Churches in Asturias
List of oldest church buildings

References

Churches in Llanes